Hopewell Township is the name of some places in the U.S. state of New Jersey:
Hopewell Township, Cumberland County, New Jersey
Hopewell Township, Mercer County, New Jersey

See also
Hopewell Township (disambiguation)

New Jersey township disambiguation pages